Bagh-e Golbon (also Romanized as Bāgh-e Golbon) is a village in Estarabad-e Jonubi Rural District, in the Central District of Gorgan County, Golestan Province, Iran. At the 2006 census, its population was 924, in 226 families.

References 

Populated places in Gorgan County